"Possum Kingdom" is a song by American alternative rock band Toadies released as the second single from their 1994 album, Rubberneck.

The song's origins lie in folklore from the band's native state of Texas. Possum Kingdom Lake is a lake in North Texas near Fort Worth. In the documentary "Dark Secrets: The Stories of Rubberneck", vocalist Vaden Todd Lewis further elaborates that he intended "Possum Kingdom" to be a continuation of the story told in the song "I Burn".  While he envisioned "I Burn" to be a story about cult members immolating themselves in order to ascend to a higher plane, "Possum Kingdom" was about one of the immolated people becoming "just smoke, and ...he goes to Possum Kingdom [Lake] and tries to find somebody to join him."

Music video
The music video for "Possum Kingdom" was directed by Thomas Mignone and begins with a body bag being dragged from a lake, then pans to the lead singer, Vaden Todd Lewis, singing in a dark room. It then pans to a shot of the band performing in a small venue with several dozen dancing fans. The individual who dragged the body bag from the river then opens it and begins violently hacking away at it. The video ends by revealing the individual is actually an ice sculptor that is creating the image of a beautiful woman. A drop of water is seen streaming down her face. Filming was done for the stage scene at a small venue, run by Brannon Richards and Kevin Hurnden, called The Crossing.

Charts

In other media 
Possum Kingdom was included in the setlist for the Xbox 360 edition of Guitar Hero II.

References

External links
 An article and interview with the Toadies

Toadies songs
1994 singles
Songs about death
Songs about Texas
Song recordings produced by Tom Rothrock
1994 songs
Interscope Records singles
Grunge songs